also known by his aliases Geoform 187 and The Cunning God of Death, is a fictional supervillain and one of the main antagonists of the Metroid series. A draconic extraterrestrial hailing from the planet Zebes, he became Samus Aran's archnemesis after murdering the latter's parents as he led a Space Pirate raid on her homeworld. Though having been destroyed numerous times by Samus, he is always resurrected, due in equal part to Space Pirate engineering and his natural regenerative ability, which allows him to swiftly recover from what would otherwise be fatal wounds as long as he is able to consume enough biomatter from his fallen adversaries.

Originally appearing as a subordinate of Mother Brain (another primary antagonist), he returns in Metroid Prime and Metroid Prime 3: Corruption in his cybernetic Meta Ridley form, commanding the Space Pirates himself. He is fully sentient and he can also speak in the Metroid e-manga.

He is named after Ridley Scott, director of the 1979 film Alien, which has been described by character designer Yoshio Sakamoto as a "huge influence" on the world of the Metroid series.

Overview
Ridley's debut is in the Nintendo Entertainment System video game Metroid. He and Kraid are Space Pirate figureheads charged with protecting Mother Brain at the base on Zebes, where they are cloning Metroids with the intention of converting them into biological weapons.

Throughout the series, Ridley has undergone a variety of changes in appearance. In the original Metroid game, he was roughly the same size as protagonist Samus Aran and sported a more alien appearance (particularly in official artwork, which depicted him with eight eyes running down the length of his head and a small, lamprey-like mouth). His cybernetic form during the events of the Prime series is referred to as Meta Ridley and incorporates various ballistic weapon systems. A robotic duplicate, known as Ridley Robot or Mecha Ridley, appears as the final boss in Zero Mission. Metroid: Other M showcases Ridley's life cycle, beginning as a small creature named Little Birdie that molts into a reptilian Mystery Creature before molting again into his adult draconic form.

He makes guest appearances in other Nintendo games: Nintendo Land; Dead or Alive: Dimensions; and his character and associated music are a staple of the Super Smash Bros. series. He appears in comics: Captain N: The Game Master (1990); Nintendo Power; and the Monthly Magazine Z manga by Koji Tazawa.

Development

Mike Sneath, one of three senior character artists for Metroid Prime, was responsible for designing the Meta Ridley version of Ridley seen in Metroid Prime. It took him about "20 to 25 days" to model and texture Meta Ridley, citing the wings as having taken a few days of his time, commenting that it took him a while to get the shaders to work to give his wings the appearance of having "holographic energy". He was not involved with designing the battle with Meta Ridley, which was left up to the game designers. Andrew Jones, the lead concept artist for Metroid Prime, had little to do with the design of Ridley. The initial design submitted was rejected by Nintendo, while the second design the artists submitted was approved. Steve Barcia, the executive producer of Retro Studios, called Ridley his favorite enemy from Metroid Prime due to the quality of the battle and his fan appeal. He added that such a battle was rare for a first-person shooter, which helped to set Metroid Prime apart.

The director of the Super Smash Bros. series, Masahiro Sakurai, stated in an interview with Nintendo Power that the development team considered including Ridley as a playable character in Super Smash Bros. Brawl but decided against the idea due to creative difficulties. In an interview with IGN about Ridley's exclusion from Super Smash Bros. for Nintendo 3DS and Wii U, Sakurai argued that reducing Ridley's size, wingspan or mobility to include him as a fighter would not be true to the character, who is supposed to be a "truly threatening presence" that could only be correctly portrayed as a stage boss unencumbered by a fighter's size and balance restrictions. Sakurai said that high demand from players inspired him to add several playable characters to Super Smash Bros. Ultimate, including Ridley's only playable role in any game at the time.

Reception
Throughout the history of the Metroid series, Ridley has received positive reception as the series antagonist. He is widely considered one of the most renowned and best Nintendo villains of all time and is regarded as a favorite among both the Metroid fandom and the series's developers. Nintendo Power lists him as their sixth favorite Nintendo villain, citing both his involvement in the death of Samus's parents as well as his determination, dying at Samus's hands many times yet always coming back. Computer and Video Games editor Mike Jackson described Ridley as a "fan favorite". GameDaily called him the 16th greatest Nintendo character, commenting that he "beats Mother Brain by a mile as the coolest Metroid villain". IGN editor Jesse Schedeen called Ridley the real villain of the Metroid series, commenting that he would have to be included in a Metroid film if one were made due to him being too important to leave out. 1UP.com editor Nadia Oxford described the Nintendo Comics System version of Ridley as being more of a "squashed bug" than a "fearsome reptile". The 1UP.com staff listed the battle with Ridley in Super Metroid as among the most iconic in Nintendo history. They stated that his appearance in Super Metroid is more memorable than any other appearance in the Metroid series, and that his return from the original game added some familiarity to Metroid fans. GamesRadar listed him third on their list of video game villains who will never stay dead, calling him Samus's "great white whale" that, even while he has tormented her throughout her life, she just cannot seem to kill. Gaming Nexus criticized the lack of fellow Metroid villain Kraid in Metroid Prime 3: Corruption, but stated that the developers made up for it by adding the best Ridley battle in the series's history. IGN editors Phil Pirrello and Richard George listed Ridley as the second most deserving Nintendo character for inclusion in Super Smash Bros. Brawl, to broaden the range of the series.

The role of Ridley's clone in Metroid: Other M was criticized for the scene in which Samus is too immobilized by memories of her childhood trauma at the original Ridley's hands to fight back even after he attacks her, not snapping out of it until this episode seemingly results in the death of a longtime friend of hers. Abbie Heppe of G4's reaction to the scene as a sexist portrayal of one of gaming's greatest female icons and narratively incongruous with the plentiful instances of Samus engaging Ridley head-on without issue in previous games typified the response from critics and many longtime fans of the series. Defenders of the scene claim that the message of the scene is about empowerment instead of weakness and cite a subplot within the official manga wherein Samus's first encounter with Ridley leaves her afflicted with symptoms of posttraumatic stress disorder. Jeremy Parish of Polygon ranked 73 fighters from Super Smash Bros. Ultimate "from garbage to glorious", listing Ridley as 57th. In 2018, Paste magazine writer Holly Green ranked Ridley as third of her favorite of the newcomers in Smash Bros. Ultimate. Gavin Jasper of Den of Geek ranked Ridley as 25th on his list of Super Smash Bros. Ultimate characters, and further stated that Ridley is the most menacing villain of the entire Smash roster.

Notes

References

Clone characters in video games
Fictional criminals in video games
Cyborg characters in video games
Extraterrestrial characters in video games
Extraterrestrial supervillains
Fictional generals
Fictional mass murderers
Fictional monsters
Fictional dragons
Intelligent Systems characters
Male characters in video games
Metroid characters
Fictional pirates in video games
Pterosaurs in fiction
Fictional pterosaurs
Fictional dinosaurs
Nintendo antagonists
Robotic dragons
Space pirates
Super Smash Bros. fighters
Video game bosses
Video game characters introduced in 1986
Dragon characters in video games
Ridley Scott